Jeremy Padawer (born October 26, 1973) is an American businessman, Internet entrepreneur, and animated television producer. He is the cocreator and executive producer of the Nickelodeon animated series Monsuno and the former executive vice president, marketing at Jakks Pacific, former chief operating officer of Pacific Animation Partners, former copresident and partner of Wicked Cool Toys, and current partner at Jazwares, a subsidiary of Alleghany Capital Corporation.

Early web pioneer

In 1996, Padawer developed a network of transactional toy and gaming websites. Advertisers included Disney, Onsale.com, and Amazon.com. Most notably, Newsweek followed Padawer's tracking of the plunge in Beanie Baby valuations in 1998–1999 on Padawer's AbsoluteBeanies.com.

Padawer is an early domain name investor. Padawer's sale of www.act.com to Symantec stands as one of the largest domain name transactions in history.

In addition, Padawer developed DomainAppraiser.com, a site that advised thousands of domain name holders on valuation (1999–2001), and Schmuck.com, an online monthly with material by amateur humorists and users (1999–2000).

Toy business

In 2001, Mattel recruited Padawer out of Vanderbilt University's MBA program. Padawer managed Hotwheels, Nickelodeon, and a relaunch of Masters of the Universe.

In 2003, Padawer moved to Jakks Pacific, where he headed up boys' entertainment brands. Padawer reinvented the WWE toy line and launched over 25 brands into the mass marketplace, including Pokémon, Dragonball Z, Club Penguin, UFC, Neopets, SpongeBob SquarePants, and Phineas & Ferb.
 
Padawer was the former executive vice president and general manager of Jakks Malibu, the largest unit at Jakks Pacific. Padawer was responsible for product development, marketing, and entertainment content development across all JAKKS Malibu business unit categories.

In April 2013, Padawer joined Wicked Cool Toys as its copresident and partner.

In May 2017, the Pokémon Company International announced it had become a strategic investor in Wicked Cool Toys and granted Wicked Cool Toys the global Pokémon toy license outside of Asia.

In October 2019, Jazwares, a subsidiary of Alleghany Capital Corporation (Y - NYSE), acquired Wicked Cool Toys.  The combined company develops, manufactures, and markets toys and collectibles globally for Squishmallows and more.

Entertainment development

Padawer is the cocreator and executive producer of the American-Japanese animated series Monsuno. The show premiered in the United States on February 23, 2012, on  Nickelodeon's sister channel, Nicktoons, and on TV Tokyo in Japan in October 2012.

In addition to cocreating and executive producer duties, he also assembled a global strategic partnership between Jakks Pacific, Nickelodeon, Topps, Michael Eisner, and Fremantle Media.

Awards and recognition
In 2010, Padawer was inducted into the ToyFare Magazine hall of fame.

References

External links
 Official site Jeremy.com
 

1973 births
Living people
American business executives
People from Germantown, Tennessee
Television producers from Tennessee